A Bagoro (plural form: Bagoreh) is a member of an ethnic group living in the Bagrot and Taisot valley, alongside the banks of river Bagrot, village of Jalaalabad, and in Danyor city.

The group shares the same language, cuisines and traditions.

Etymology
The word etymologically derives from the word bagharey, meaning "distributors" in the Shina language, as the Bagrot valley was once famous for its agricultural products: crop, fruits and vegetables and its people were famous for their magnanimity and hospitality.

References

Social groups of Gilgit Baltistan
Social groups of Pakistan
Hindu Kush